The 1982–83 West Virginia Mountaineers men's basketball team represented West Virginia University as a member of the Atlantic-10 Conference during the 1983-84 season. The team played their home games at WVU Coliseum in Morgantown, West Virginia. Led by 5th-year head coach Gale Catlett, the Mountaineers won the conference tournament and received an automatic bid to the 1983 NCAA tournament as No. 7 seed in the East region. In the opening round, West Virginia was beaten by No. 10 seed James Madison, 57–50.

Roster

Schedule and results

|-
!colspan=9 style=| Regular season

|-
!colspan=9 style=| Atlantic-10 Tournament

|-
!colspan=9 style=| NCAA Tournament

Rankings

Awards and honors
Greg Jones – Atlantic 10 co-Player of the Year

References

West Virginia
West Virginia Mountaineers men's basketball seasons
West Virginia Mountaineers men's basketball
West Virginia Mountaineers men's basketball
West Virginia